Roberto Vega Campusano (born 1 February 1978) is a Chilean lawyer that is a member of the Chilean Constitutional Convention.

He was Regional Ministerial Secretary of Mining of the IV Region of Coquimbo.

References

External links
 BCN Profile

Living people
1978 births
21st-century Chilean lawyers
21st-century Chilean politicians
Pontifical Catholic University of Valparaíso alumni
National Renewal (Chile) politicians
Members of the Chilean Constitutional Convention